The MG F-type Magna is a six-cylinder-engined car that was produced by MG from October 1931 to 1932. It was also known as the 12/70. 

Looking for a car to fill the gap between the M-Type Midget and the 18/80, MG turned to another of the engines that had become available from William Morris's acquisition of Wolseley. This was the 1271 cc 6-cylinder version of the overhead camshaft engine used in the 1929 MG M type Midget and previously seen in the 1930 Wolseley Hornet and had dummy side covers to disguise its origins. Drive was to the rear wheels through a four-speed non-synchromesh gearbox of ENV manufacture. The chassis was a  longer version of the one from the MG D-type with suspension by half-elliptic springs and Hartford friction shock absorbers all round with rigid front and rear axles. Wire wheels with 4.00 x 19 tyres and centre lock fixing were used.

With its sloping radiator and long bonnet the F-Type is an attractive car capable of reaching . 188 of the cars were supplied in chassis form to outside coachbuilders such as Abbey, Jarvis, Stiles and Windover.

F
The original F was restricted by only having 8-inch (200 mm) brake drums, which, with its 4-seat bodies, was not really adequate.  Many F1 cars have subsequently been fitted with the larger F2 brakes.

The four-seat tourer cost £250 and the Foursome coupé cost £289.

F2
Introduced in late 1932 the F2 was the open 2-seater car in the range. It also got much needed enhanced braking by fitting larger 12-inch (300 mm) drums all round. The body with straight-topped doors came from the J-Type Midget.

F3
The F3, also introduced in 1932, used the same brakes as the F2 but had the 4-seater tourer and Foursome Coupé bodies fitted. The engine cooling was improved by changing the cooling water flow.

See also
1936 Benalla Centenary Race

References

 MG Sportscars. Malcolm Green. CLB International. 1997

External links 

F-type
Cars introduced in 1931